North Kingstown Senior High School (North Kingstown High School) is a public secondary school located in North Kingstown, Rhode Island. The school, which serves grades 9–12, is attended by residents of both North Kingstown and Jamestown. As of 2014–15, there were 1,407 students enrolled, and the faculty consisted of approximately 100 teachers.

History 
In 1901, the State Board of Education in Rhode Island approved the establishment of the Wickford Academy (now known as the North Kingstown Senior High School).  Four years later, in 1905, the first graduates received their diplomas. 2005 marked the school's 100th anniversary.In the 2000's, A new school building replaced the old building, and is noted for opening the day after 9/11

Notable alumni
Elizabeth Beisel, a 2010 graduate of North Kingstown Senior High School, is a former international swimmer who won two Olympic medals. Beisel graduated from University of Florida in 2014 after competing in the 2008 and 2012 Olympics. She retired from swimming in 2018 and competed in Survivor: Island of the Idols.

Peter F. Neronha, a 1981 graduate of North Kingstown Senior High School, is the current Attorney General of Rhode Island and former United States Attorney for the District of Rhode Island.

Achievements 
In 2013, U.S. News & World Report rated North Kingstown High School as the third best high school in the state of Rhode Island, awarding it a Silver Medal on a national scale. The school is accredited by the State of Rhode Island and the New England Association of Schools and Colleges.

References

External links 
 North Kingstown High School website
 North Kingstown School Department website
 US News School Data

Educational institutions established in 1901
Buildings and structures in North Kingstown, Rhode Island
Schools in Washington County, Rhode Island
Public high schools in Rhode Island
1901 establishments in Rhode Island